The 2019 Indian general elections held in India between 11 April and 23 April 2019 to constitute the 17th Lok Sabha. The election in Bihar took place in 7 phases.

Election Schedule 
The constituency-wise election schedule is as follows:

Alliances

Opinion Poll

Results

Party-wise

Alliance wise

Constituency-wise Results

Assembly segments wise lead of Parties

References 

2019 Indian general election by state or union territory
Indian general elections in Bihar
2010s in Bihar